The MTV Asia Awards 2004 in Singapore was hosted by Vanness Wu and Michelle Branch. It was held on February 14, 2004, at the Singapore Indoor Stadium.

International awards

Favorite Pop Act

Black Eyed Peas
Blue
Matchbox Twenty
Simple Plan
T.A.T.u.

Favorite Rock Act
Audioslave
Evanescence
Linkin Park
Metallica
Radiohead

Favorite Video
Christina Aguilera — "Beautiful"
Coldplay — "The Scientist"
Justin Timberlake — "Cry Me a River"
Linkin Park — "Somewhere I Belong"
Radiohead — "There There"

Favorite Female Artist
Beyoncé
Christina Aguilera
Dido
Jennifer Lopez
Michelle Branch

Favorite Male Artist
Eminem
Gareth Gates
Justin Timberlake
Ricky Martin
Robbie Williams

Favorite Breakthrough Artist
50 Cent
Evanescence
Sean Paul
Stacie Orrico
T.A.T.u.

Regional awards

Favorite Artist Mainland China

Han Hong
Li Quan
Pu Shu
Si Qin Ge Ri Le
Sun Nan

Favorite Artist Hong Kong
Andy Lau
Eason Chan
Hacken Lee
Joey Yung
Sammi Cheng

Favorite Artist India
Abhijeet
Falguni Pathak
Rekha Bhardwaj
Shweta Shetty
Vaishali Samant

Favorite Artist Indonesia
Ari Lasso
Audy
Cokelat
Iwan Fals
Mocca

Favorite Artist Korea
BoA
Fly to the Sky
Lee Hyori
Wheesung
Seven

Favorite Artist Malaysia
Jamal Abdillah
Misha Omar
Siti Sarah
Siti Nurhaliza
Too Phat

Favorite Artist Philippines
Barbie's Cradle
Ogie Alcasid
Parokya ni Edgar
Regine Velasquez
Rivermaya

Favorite Artist Singapore
A-do
Ayden
Stefanie Sun
Ho Yeow Sun
Tanya Chua

Favorite Artist Taiwan
A-mei
David Tao
Jay Chou
Jolin Tsai
S.H.E

Favorite Artist Thailand
Armchair
Blackhead
Boyd Kosiyabong
Parn Thanaporn
Thongchai McIntyre

Special awards

Asian Film Award
Michelle Yeoh

Most Influential Artist Award
BoA

The Inspiration Award
Anita Mui

Lifetime Achievement Award
Mariah Carey (presented by boy band Blue)

MTV Asia Awards
2004 music awards